Frederic Chiu (born 20 October 1964) is an American classical concert pianist.

Education
Chiu was born in Ithaca, New York.  He studied music seriously with William Eltzroth at Butler University in Indianapolis, IN, with Karen Shaw (and also studied computer science) at Indiana University, then pursued his musical studies in New York at the Juilliard School, where he studied with Abbey Simon. He also studied with Aube Tzerko, Marvin Wolfthal and Marian Rybicki. During his formative years, he won numerous piano competitions, including the Kosciuszko Foundation Chopin Piano Competition and the Music Teachers National Association Competition, both in 1984. He was awarded the American Pianists Association Fellowship (formerly known as the Beethoven Foundation) in 1985. He was given the Petschek Award by the Juilliard School in 1994, which led to a recital in Alice Tully Hall in Lincoln Center. He was also awarded the Avery Fisher Career Grant in 1996.

Career
After his studies, Chiu moved to France, where he lived for 12 years. His career developed without entering the circuit of international piano competitions. His recording career began in 1991 with Harmonia Mundi USA, with the well-received release of a program of piano transcriptions. He followed that with a large project of recording the complete solo piano works of Sergei Prokofiev. His recorded repertoire includes Mendelssohn, Rossini, Chopin, Liszt, Grieg, Brahms, Ravel, Decaux, Schoenberg, Schubert, Prokofiev and Saint-Saëns. 
He recorded the Liszt transcription for solo piano of the Beethoven Symphony #5. In 2015, he released the first Classical piano recording on the Yamaha Entertainment Group label, Distant Voices: piano music of Claude Debussy & Gao Ping. In 2016 he released an album called "Hymns and Dervishes" which comprises a selection of Middle-eastern inspired works and Western inspired works by Gurdjieff/de Hartmann. It was released by Centaur Records. In 2019, Centaur also released a chamber music recording, with the violinist William Harvey, including the Schubert Fantasie in C for Piano and Violin.

In 1993, he entered the Van Cliburn International Piano Competition, where his exclusion from the final round created enormous media coverage. He was invited increasingly to play in the United States, where he eventually returned to live.

Highlights of his performances include concerts with the BBC Concert Orchestra and the BBC Scottish Symphony Orchestra, the Indianapolis Symphony, the Kansas City Symphony, the Dayton Philharmonic, the Hartford Symphony, the Orchestre de Bretagne of France, the China National Symphony, and the Taipei National Symphony. He has played recitals in many major cities in Europe, Asia, Northern Africa, South America and North America. In chamber music, he frequently performs with long-time friend Joshua Bell. Other artists he has collaborated with include the St. Lawrence Quartet, the Shanghai Quartet, the Daedalus Quartet, cellist Gary Hoffman, violinist Pierre Amoyal and clarinetist David Krakauer.

Chiu has given master classes at major universities and music schools around the world, including the Juilliard School, New England Conservatory, Banff and the Jacob School of Music at Indiana University. He teaches "surgical pedaling"—precise and interactive use of the una corda, sostenuto and sustain pedals that enhance the piano's coloristic possibilities beyond what traditional pedal usage provides. Surgical pedaling can focus or diffuse overtones, highlight melodic lines independent of dynamic level, and create an unusual range of tiered coloristic effects.

Frederic Chiu also created a series of workshops entitled "Deeper Performance Studies" (originally named Deeper Piano Studies) that approaches piano playing through non-traditional methods uniting different philosophies of music, performance and learning.

In 2000, Chiu was on the jury for the Outstanding Amateur Competition in Fort Worth, TX. He has also served on the jury for the Utrecht Liszt Competition, the E-Competition, the American Pianist Association and the World Piano Competition in Cincinnati.

Chiu is also co-director of Beechwood Arts, a non-profit corporation that seeks to change the way the arts are created and experienced, through a program of intimate, innovative and immersive events. These include Arts Immersion Salons that include Music, Art, Performance, Film and Culinary Arts in one event around a common theme, and Culinary+Art which combines high-end restaurant experiences with gallery-quality exhibits.

Chiu is a Yamaha Artist. In 2014, he marked his 25th anniversary as a Yamaha Artist with special commemorative events, including concerts at the Newport Music Festival and in New York City at Miller Theatre.
He has been a notable supporter of Yamaha's new products, including the CFX line of grand pianos, the Disklavier Mark IV, DisklavierTV, the PSR-OR700 Keyboard, the GranTouch, the AvantGrand and Yamaha Entertainment Group's recording label. He was the first Classical artist to record for YEG, in 2015, with the release of Distant Voices, available on three platforms: Audio CD, Video DVD and DisklavierTV.

References

External links
Frederic Chiu Bio at Bach Cantatas
Frederic Chiu official website

Living people
American classical pianists
American male classical pianists
1964 births
Musicians from Ithaca, New York
20th-century American pianists
Classical musicians from New York (state)
21st-century classical pianists
20th-century American male musicians
21st-century American male musicians
21st-century American pianists
Centaur Records artists
Juilliard School alumni
Juilliard School people